Carla Cassola (15 December 1947 – 24 July 2022) was an Italian actress and composer.

Born in Taormina, Messina, before starting her acting career Cassola studied singing, piano and guitar . Active on stage, in films and on television, she taught acting in various institutions, including the Centre universitaire in Nancy. Cassola was also a voice actress and has won a Silver Ribbon for the dubbing of Tilda Swinton in Orlando. She was also a composer of Incidental music for stage works.

Selected filmography 
 Death Rides a Horse (1967)
 The Howl (1970)
 The House of Clocks (1989)
 Demonia (1990)
 Captain America (1990)
 The Devil's Daughter (1991)
 Where Are You? I'm Here (1993)
 Once a Year, Every Year (1994)
 The Butterfly's Dream (1994)
 Giovani e belli (1996)

References

External links 
 
 

1947 births
2022 deaths
Italian film actresses
People from Taormina
Italian stage actresses
20th-century Italian actresses
Italian television actresses
Italian voice actresses
Nastro d'Argento winners
Actors from the Province of Messina